The Chekanovsky Ridge is a range of mountains in the Bulunsky District, Yakutia, Russian Federation. The area of the range is uninhabited. 

The range was named after explorer of Siberia Alexander Chekanovsky (1833–1876).

History
Rising in a remote and unexplored area, the range was formerly unknown. In 1875, during his third Siberian expedition, Alexander Chekanovsky intended to "go along the banks of the Lena to the mouth and, if possible, then go to the mouth of the Olenyok from the Laptev Sea." He hoped to have time to conduct geological exploration of the banks of the Lena River before the onset of winter, but a short summer frustrated his plans. He explored inland from the deep and wide lower course of the Eyekit, and then along the rocky and mountainous watershed area lying between the Lena and the Olenyok, descending along the Kelimyar river to the Olenyok. From the Kelimyar he traced the course of the Olenyok to its mouth. By the 26 August Chekanovsky saw the ocean from the top of Mount Karanchat. 

By the 18 September the expedition was already in Bulun, having safely travelled along the frozen Lena. Chekanovsky went across the mountains and tundra terrain by reindeer reaching Irkutsk on 20 December 1875. The mountain chain that Chekanovsky had discovered was later named Chekanovsky Ridge at the suggestion of Russian Arctic explorer Edward Toll.

Geography
The Laptev Sea lies to the north beyond the delta and the Kharaulakh Range stretches along the facing bank of the Lena. The Olenyok flows to the west and the Kystyk Plateau (Плато Кыстык) rises in the southwest.

The highest point of the range is an unnamed peak reaching  located near the northern end. The slopes look barren and are covered mainly with lichen bush tundra.

Hydrography 
From the eastern slopes of the Chekanovsky Ridge originate small tributaries of the Lena, the largest of which is the Ulakhan-Yuryakh. The Eyekit river cuts eastwards across the southern part. The Kelimyar, one of the right tributaries of the Olenyok, has its sources in the western flank of the ridge and the Bulkur in the eastern.

See also
List of mountains and hills of Russia

References

External links
Wild reindeer natural reserve ALROSA-Rangifer Chekanovsky created in Yakutia
Late Quaternary history of the accumulation plain north of the Chekanovsky Ridge (Lena Delta, Russia) - a multidisciplinary approach

Mountain ranges of the Sakha Republic
Central Siberian Plateau